The 1996–97 La Liga season, the 66th since its establishment, started on 31 August 1996 and finished on 23 June 1997.

Promotion and relegation
Teams promoted from 1995–96 Segunda División
 Hércules
 Logroñés
 Extremadura

Teams relegated to 1996–97 Segunda División
 Albacete
 Mérida
 Salamanca

Team information

Clubs and locations
1996–97 season was composed of the following clubs:

 

 

 It was the last season with 22 teams in La Liga. To reduce the number of teams in the league, the last four teams, CF Extremadura, Sevilla FC, Hércules CF and CD Logroñés, were relegated and the fifth-to-last team, Rayo Vallecano, played a relegation playoff and was also relegated.

Personnel and sponsoring

League table

Positions by round

Source: LFP 1-4 5-8 9-12 13-16 17-20 21-22

Note: UEFA Cup Winners' Cup spot (in yellow) being non-related with a position in La Liga, does not appear until the team is assured to be qualified. Conditions to be assured are: Copa del Rey winner cannot reach UEFA Champions League's places or one of finalists' Copa del Rey cannot qualify mathematically to UEFA Champions League. Barcelona was qualified to UEFA Champions League since 39th round, thus Betis could not reach UEFA Champions League places, so after matchday 39 Betis' places are coloured in yellow. In light yellow the spot expected for 1997–98 UEFA Cup Winners' Cup.

Results

Relegation playoff

First Leg

Second Leg

Pichichi Trophy

Signings
Source: http://www.bdfutbol.com/es/t/t1996-97.html

See also
 1996–97 Real Madrid C.F. season
 1996–97 FC Barcelona season
 1996–97 Atlético Madrid season

References

La Liga seasons
1996–97 in Spanish football leagues
Spain